Ray Sambrook (1933-1999) was an English footballer, who played as a winger in the Football League for Coventry City, Manchester City and Doncaster Rovers.

References

1933 births
1999 deaths
Manchester City F.C. players
Association football wingers
Coventry City F.C. players
Doncaster Rovers F.C. players
English Football League players
Wednesfield F.C. players
Crewe Alexandra F.C. players
footballers from Wolverhampton
English footballers